Morton is an English, Irish, and Scottish surname. Notable people with the surname include:


A–K
Adam Morton (1945–2020), Canadian philosopher
Alan Morton (disambiguation), several people
Alicia Morton (born 1987), American actress
Andrew Morton (disambiguation), several people
(Arthur) Leslie Morton, communist historian and educator
Bill Morton (disambiguation), several people
Bubba Morton (1931–2006), American baseball player and coach
Cale Morton (born 1990), Australian footballer
Charles Morton (disambiguation), several people
Chesley V. Morton (born 1951), American politician, stockbroker
Craig Morton (born 1943), American professional football player
Cynthia C. Morton (born 1955), American geneticist
David Morton (disambiguation), several people
Dudley W. Morton (1907–1943), US Navy submarine commander during World War Two
Eddie Morton (1870–1938), An American ragtime singer
Edward Morton (disambiguation), several people
Eleanor Morton, Scottish comedian
Euan Morton (born 1977) is a Scottish actor, singer, and voiceover artist.
Genevieve Morton (born 1986) South African top model
Harry Morton (disambiguation), several people
Henry Morton (politician) (1867–1932), Australian politician
Henry Morton (scientist) (1836–1902), scientist, first president of Stevens Institute of Technology
Henry Vollam Morton (1892–1979), journalist and writer
Ian Morton (born 1970), English cricketer
Jalen Morton (born 1997), American football player
Jelly Roll Morton (1885/1890–1941), influential jazz pianist, bandleader and composer
Jenny Morton, New Zealand neurobiologist and academic
Joe Morton (born 1947), American actor
John Morton (disambiguation), several people
Jordan Morton, Scottish footballer
Joy Morton, Morton Salt Company owner
Julius Sterling Morton (1832–1902), United States Secretary of Agriculture
Kate Morton (born 1976), Australian author
Kathy Morton, professional name used by Kathy Godfrey early in her broadcasting career

L–Z
Les Morton (born 1958), English racewalker
Levi P. Morton (1824–1920), 22nd Vice-President of the United States
Lindsay Morton, American cancer epidemiology 
Lorraine H. Morton (1918–2018), American politician and educator
Marcus Morton (1784–1864), Governor of Massachusetts
Marcus Morton (jurist) (1819–1891), Chief Justice of the Massachusetts Supreme Judicial Court
Mark Morton (disambiguation), several people
Mary Morton (1879–1965), British sculptor
May Morton (1894–1966), English actress
Michael Morton (disambiguation), several people
Oliver Hazard Perry Morton (1823–1877), U.S. senator from Indiana
Parker Thomas "Bo" Morton (1911–1995), Australian rules footballer and coach
Paul Morton (disambiguation), several people
Peter Morton, a founder of Hard Rock Cafe and owner of Hard Rock Hotel in Las Vegas
Philip Morton (disambiguation), several people
PJ Morton (born 1981), American singer
Richard Morton (disambiguation), several people
Ricky Morton (born 1956), professional wrestler
Robert Morton (disambiguation), several people
Runako Morton (1978–2012), West Indian cricketer
Samantha Morton (born 1977), Academy Award-nominated English actress
Samuel Morton (1894–1923), Chicago mobster 
Samuel George Morton (1799–1851), American physician and natural scientist
Sebastian Arocha Morton, American record producer
Thomas Morton (disambiguation), several people
Wendy Morton (born 1967), British politician
William Morton (disambiguation), several people

See also 
Earl of Morton, a title in the Scottish peerage
Justice Morton (disambiguation)
Morton (disambiguation)
Moreton (disambiguation)
Surnames of Lowland Scottish origin
Scottish surnames

English-language surnames
Surnames of British Isles origin